Alejandro Guerrero is a paralympic athlete from Mexico competing mainly in category T11 distance running events.

Alejandro was part of the Mexican team who travelled to Atlanta for the 1996 Summer Paralympics, there he competed in the 5000m where he won the silver medal and also in the 10000m where he won the gold medal.  He also competed in the 2000 Summer Paralympics in Sydney in the same two events but without any medal success.

References

External links
 

Paralympic athletes of Mexico
Athletes (track and field) at the 1996 Summer Paralympics
Athletes (track and field) at the 2000 Summer Paralympics
Paralympic gold medalists for Mexico
Paralympic silver medalists for Mexico
Medalists at the 1996 Summer Paralympics
Living people
Year of birth missing (living people)
Paralympic medalists in athletics (track and field)
Mexican male long-distance runners
Visually impaired long-distance runners
Paralympic long-distance runners
20th-century Mexican people